Owensville (also, Glen Mary) is a former settlement in Inyo County, California. It was located west of the future site of the modern-day town of Laws. Owensville was started as a mining camp in 1863. By 1871 it had been abandoned. The former settlement site is on U.S. Route 6 north of Bishop, California.

A post office operated at Owensville from 1866 to 1870, when it was transferred to Bishop, California (then called Bishop Creek). From 1868 to 1869, the town was called Glen Mary. The site is now registered as California Historical Landmark #230 as the "First Permanent White Habitation in Owens Valley" assigned on June 20, 1935..

The California Historical Landmark reads:

See also
California Historical Landmarks in Inyo County
History of California through 1899

References

Former settlements in Inyo County, California
Owens Valley
Former populated places in California
Populated places established in 1863
Populated places disestablished in 1871
1863 establishments in California
1871 disestablishments in California
California Historical Landmarks